Krishna Riboud (née Roy; 12 October 1926 – 27 June 2000) was an Indian historian and art collector, specializing in Indian and Chinese antiquities and textiles.

Riboud began her textile collection in the 1950s, when she started purchasing Baluchari saris from Bengal,. She was a member of the jury of the 1958 Cannes Film Festival.

Early life and education
Roy was born on 12 October 1926 in Dhaka, the daughter of Rajendra Roy, director of public health in East Bengal and Ena Tagore Roy. Her mother was a grandniece of Rabindranath Tagore. Her father died, when Roy was ten years old, and she was raised by her maternal uncle Soumendranath Tagore in Calcutta. Her uncle was influential in her life. In 1983, she told The New Yorker, "My uncle, whom I had a passion for, was a revolutionary Marxist, and his Marxism was very different from the Communism we know now." She also recalled witnessing her uncle being arrested by British police and forced on to a train at Calcutta railway station.

While on a visit to India, Lois Kellogg, daughter of Spencer Kellogg, Jr., the scion of a wealthy American family, fell ill and received treatment from Roy's father Rajendra. Spencer Kellogg, Jr. later helped secure the release of Soumendranath Tagore from prison. After returning to the United States, Lois Kellogg wrote a letter to Ena Tagore, requesting her to enroll her daughter at Wellesley College. Lois Kellogg also offered to serve as Krishna's guardian, and offered to let her spend her winter vacations at the Kelloggs' home in Scottsdale, Arizona, and weekends at their home in Connecticut. With her mother's permission, Krishna Roy left for Wellesley College in 1943. She received letters of introduction to John Dewey and Albert Einstein, both of whom knew her uncles. Krishna Roy visited John Dewey, who requested her not to study Western philosophy. She also visited Einstein at his home in Princeton.

Later life
Roy attended a party for French photographer Henri Cartier-Bresson given by the editor of Harper's Bazaar in the spring of 1947. At the party, she met the chairman of Schlumberger, Jean Riboud. Riboud would later describe her as "one of three absolutely adorable, beautiful young Indian girls who were visiting from Wellesley College". Recalling the meeting, Roy later stated that Riboud had made "no impression whatsoever". After their first meeting, Riboud invited Roy to take a walk during which he asked about her uncles, and they discussed India, her philosophy studies, and modern art. He also asked her to join him and his sister Françoise, on a trip around the United States. Roy agreed, and in the summer of 1949, the three traveled by car to Seattle, along the Pacific Coast to Arizona, and across the country to the home of American poet and critic Charles Olson at Black Mountain College.

Roy and Riboud decided to get married in 1949. Ena Tagore Roy wanted her daughter to marry an Indian, and Riboud's mother Hélène wanted her son to marry a Catholic. At Françoise's suggestion, the couple wrote to their mothers informing them of the wedding, but chose not to wait for their replies. Roy and Riboud married on 1 October 1949 at the Kelloggs' house in Connecticut. Françoise served as matron of honor, Charles Olson served as best man, and Roy was attended by her friend Rita Pandit. Their only son Christophe was born in 1950 in New York.

It is reported that the couple had an extensive friendship circle which included political figures like François Mitterrand, Indira Gandhi and Ne Win and art personalities, such as Yves Tanguy, Henri Cartier-Bresson, Isamu Noguchi, M. F. Hussain, Joan Miró and Max Ernst. They also had an art collection, part of which was later donated by Krishna Ribaud to the Musée Guimet, where a separate gallery of the Jean and Krishna Riboud collection is being maintained.

Jean Riboud died in Paris in 1986, and their only son Christophe died in a car accident in Switzerland in 1990. Over the next decade, Krishna divided her time between France and India. Krishna Riboud died at her home in Paris, France, on 27 June 2000.

References

External links
 Biography on Persee.fr

1926 births
2000 deaths
People from Dhaka
Tagore family
Indian women historians
Indian art collectors
Indian emigrants to France
Wellesley College alumni